XHRX-FM is a radio station on 103.5 FM in Guadalajara, broadcasting from Cerro Grande Santa Fe. The station is owned by Radiorama and carries a grupera format known as La Tapatía.

History
XHRX received its first concession on November 28, 1988. It was owned by Radio Unido, S.A., a Radiorama subsidiary, and located in Zapotlanejo.

References

Radio stations in Guadalajara
Radio stations established in 1988